A total eclipse is an eclipse where the eclipsed body is completely obscured. Total eclipse may also  refer to:

People
 Total Eclipse, a DJ from The X-Ecutioners

Arts, entertainment, and media

Music

Groups
 Total Eclipse (American band), a power metal band from San Francisco
 Total Eclipse (band), a Goa trance music group

Albums
 Total Eclipse (Billy Cobham album), 1974
 Total Eclipse (Black Moon album), 2003
 Total Eclipse (Bobby Hutcherson album), 1969

Songs
 "Total Eclipse", a song by Alan Parsons Project from the album, I Robot
 "Total Eclipse", an aria from George Frideric Handel's oratorio Samson
 "Total Eclipse", a song by Iron Maiden from the album, The Number of the Beast
 "Total Eclipse", a song written by Kristian Hoffman and recorded by Klaus Nomi
 "Total Eclipse" / "Die schwarze Witwe", a double A-side single by Rosenstolz featuring Marc Almond and Nina Hagen
 "Total Eclipse of the Heart", song recorded 1983 by Bonnie Tyler

Games
 Total Eclipse (1988 video game), a first-person adventure game
 Total Eclipse (1994 video game), a space shooter
 Total Eclipse (role-playing game), 2011

Literature
 Muv-Luv Alternative: Total Eclipse, a Japanese novel series, spin-off of the Muv-Luv franchise
 Total Eclipse, a novel by John Brunner

Other arts, entertainment, and media
 Total Eclipse (comics), a comic book published by Eclipse Comics
 Total Eclipse (film), a film about Arthur Rimbaud, starring Leonardo DiCaprio
 "Total Eclipse" (Robin Hood), 2009 BBC television series episode
 Total Eclipse (web series), 2018 web series produced by Brat

Other uses
 Total Eclipse, the manufacturer designation for an upgraded Eclipse 500 aircraft; cf. Eclipse Aerospace